A total lunar eclipse took place on Monday, October 28, 1985, the second of two total lunar eclipses in 1985, the first being on May 4, 1985.

Visibility

Related eclipses

Eclipses of 1985 
 A total lunar eclipse on May 4.
 A partial solar eclipse on May 19.
 A total lunar eclipse on October 28.
 A total solar eclipse on November 12.

Lunar year series

Saros series

Metonic series 
This eclipse is the second of four Metonic cycle lunar eclipses on the same date, October 28–29, each separated by 19 years:

Half-Saros cycle
A lunar eclipse will be preceded and followed by solar eclipses by 9 years and 5.5 days (a half saros). This lunar eclipse is related to two total solar eclipses of Solar Saros 133.

See also 
List of lunar eclipses
List of 20th-century lunar eclipses

Notes

External links 
 

1985-10
1985 in science
October 1985 events